Lukáš Helešic (born 29 January 1996) is a Czech rower. He competed in the men's coxless pair event at the 2016 Summer Olympics.

References

External links
 

1996 births
Living people
Czech male rowers
Olympic rowers of the Czech Republic
Rowers at the 2016 Summer Olympics
Place of birth missing (living people)
Rowers at the 2014 Summer Youth Olympics